Andrew Stephen Bones (born 18 February 1978) is a former English cricketer.  Bones is a right-handed batsman who bowls right-arm off break and who occasionally fields as a wicket-keeper.  He was born at Crewe, Cheshire.

While studying for a degree at the University of Oxford, Bones made his first-class debut for Oxford Universities against Somerset in 2000.  He made three further first-class appearances for the team that season, while the following season he made a single first-class appearance for the newly formed Oxford UCCE against Middlesex.  Bones struggled in his five first-class matches, scoring just 27 runs at an average of 3.37, with a high score of 7.

In 2002, Bones made a single appearance for Cheshire in the Minor Counties Championship against Herefordshire.

References

External links
Andrew Bones at ESPNcricinfo
Andrew Bones at CricketArchive

1978 births
Living people
Cricketers from Cheshire
Sportspeople from Crewe
Alumni of the University of Oxford
English cricketers
Oxford Universities cricketers
Oxford MCCU cricketers
Cheshire cricketers